Prem Nagar is a village in the Bhiwani district of the Indian state of Haryana. , the village had 684 households with a total population of 3,495 of which 1,849 were male and 1,646 female.
The head(Sarpanch) of the village is Rajesh Bura

In village the most famous temple is situated  the name is shri Shri 1008 jai Baba Gulab nath and Baba Bhani nath temple  . The All information is give to you from The village boy RAHUL KUMAR BOORA and Yogesh Bura.

References

Villages in Bhiwani district